Rhinella gallardoi is a species of toad in the family Bufonidae that is endemic to Argentina. Its natural habitat is temperate forests. It is threatened by habitat loss.

References

Sources

gallardoi
Amphibians of Argentina
Amphibians described in 1992
Endemic fauna of Argentina
Taxonomy articles created by Polbot